Kemmler is a German surname. Notable people with the surname include:

Carl Albert Kemmler (1813–1888), German clergyman and botanical collector
Rudy Kemmler (born surnamed Kemler; 1860–1909), U.S. baseball catcher
William Kemmler (1860–1890), U.S. murderer; first person ever executed by means of electric chair

German-language surnames